The Doughboy, also known as the Ohio World War Memorial, is a 1930 bronze sculpture by Arthur Ivone, installed outside the Ohio Statehouse in Columbus, Ohio, United States. It is mounted on a stone base with bronze plaques on three sides. The artwork was installed on the building's grounds in 1930, and underwent a restoration by George Wright between 1989 and 1992. It was surveyed by the Smithsonian Institution's "Save Outdoor Sculpture!" program in 1994.

Gallery

See also

 1930 in art

References

External links
 

1930 establishments in Ohio
1930 sculptures
Bronze sculptures in Ohio
Ohio Statehouse
Outdoor sculptures in Columbus, Ohio
Sculptures of men in Ohio
Statues in Columbus, Ohio
World War I in art